Raymond C. Hand Park is a baseball venue in Clarksville, Tennessee, United States.  It is home to the Austin Peay Governors baseball team of the NCAA Division I Ohio Valley Conference.  The facility has a seated capacity of 777 spectators, with a total capacity of over 1,000.  The facility opened on March 23, 1970, and is named for Clarksville businessman Raymond C. Hand.

History 
The park opened on March 23, 1970, as Governors Park.  In 1993, following renovations led by Clarksville businessman Charles Hand, the park was renamed Raymond C. Hand Park after Hand's father.  The park has been the home of Austin Peay State's baseball program since its 1970 construction.  As of the end of the 2010 season, the Governors have a 576-422-2 all-time record at Hand Park.

In 1996 and 1997, the independent professional Clarksville Coyotes of the Big South League (1996) and Heartland League (1997) played at the venue.

Features and renovations 
In 1993, a pair of $25,000 donations from the estate of Raymond C. Hand led to the installation of stadium lighting and construction of a new seating structure.  During 1996 and 1997, when the Clarksville Coyotes shared Hand Park, the team collaborated with the university to add ticket booths, concession stands, and restrooms.  In 2001, brick facing was added to the backstop and stadium entrance.  In 2008, an eight-foot steel outfield fence was built, including a 12-foot batter's eye.

The field also features an irrigated natural grass surface.

See also
 List of NCAA Division I baseball venues

References

College baseball venues in the United States
Austin Peay Governors baseball
Baseball venues in Tennessee
Sports venues completed in 1970
Sports in Clarksville, Tennessee
1970 establishments in Tennessee